Natasja is a given name, and may refer to:

Natasja Crone Back, Danish journalist
Natasja Saad (1974–2007), Danish reggae and dancehall artist known as "Natasja"' or "Little T"
Natalya Panina (ballroom)
Natasja Shah, (1972-) Trinidad poet
Natasja Vermeer, Dutch actress and model

See also
 Natasha
 Natacha